Hagener is an unincorporated community in Cass County, Illinois, United States. Hagener is located along a railroad line between Beardstown and Arenzville.

References

Unincorporated communities in Cass County, Illinois
Unincorporated communities in Illinois